José Carlos da Costa Araújo (7 February 1962 – 24 July 2009), best known as Zé Carlos, was a Brazilian association footballer who played as a goalkeeper. At international level, he represented the Brazil national team at the 1990 FIFA World Cup.

Career
Throughout his career (1983–2000) he played for Americano de Campos, Flamengo, Rio Branco, Cruzeiro, Vitória, XV de Piracicaba, América and Tubarão. He played also in Portugal, where he defended Vitória de Guimarães, SC Farense, and Felgueiras.
The best moment in his career came when he played for Flamengo, in the late eighties, when he won one Brazilian championship in 1987 and one Rio de Janeiro state championship in 1986.

At that time he was often called up for the Brazil national football team, but was usually the second goalkeeper after Taffarel. That was the case in the 1988 Olympics. He did play on two occasions in 1989. However, during the 1990 FIFA World Cup, he only made the third goalkeeper, after Taffarel and Acácio.

List of goals scored

Death
Zé Carlos died on 24 July 2009 of abdominal cancer, after more than one month at a hospital in Rio de Janeiro.

On 26 July 2009, after Flamengo defeated Santos for the first time in official matches playing at Vila Belmiro (Santos' stadium), the current manager of Flamengo, Andrade, who was Zé Carlos' friend and teammate in the 1980s, both in Flamengo and in Brazilian team, crying, dedicated the special victory to Zé Carlos.

References

External links
 

1962 births
2009 deaths
Deaths from cancer in Rio de Janeiro (state)
Footballers from Rio de Janeiro (city)
Association football goalkeepers
Brazilian footballers
Brazil international footballers
Brazilian expatriate footballers
1987 Copa América players
1989 Copa América players
1990 FIFA World Cup players
Footballers at the 1988 Summer Olympics
Olympic footballers of Brazil
Olympic silver medalists for Brazil
Campeonato Brasileiro Série A players
Primeira Liga players
Americano Futebol Clube players
CR Flamengo footballers
Cruzeiro Esporte Clube players
S.C. Farense players
Vitória S.C. players
F.C. Felgueiras players
Esporte Clube Vitória players
Esporte Clube XV de Novembro (Piracicaba) players
America Football Club (RJ) players
Expatriate footballers in Portugal
Copa América-winning players
Medalists at the 1988 Summer Olympics